Elections to Purbeck District Council were held on 4 May 2006. One third of the council was up for election and the Conservative Party stayed in overall control of the council. Overall turnout was 48.1%

After the election, the composition of the council was
Conservative 14
Liberal Democrat 8
Independent 1
Vacant 1

Election result

One Independent candidate was unopposed.

Ward results

References
2006 Purbeck election result
Ward results

2006
2006 English local elections
2000s in Dorset